The 2010 Dow Corning Tennis Classic singles was held in Midland, Michigan, USA.

Third seed Elena Baltacha defeated the top seed Lucie Hradecká in the finals to win the first edition of the Dow Corning Tennis Classic as a 100K tournament.

Seeds

Draw

Finals

Top half

Bottom half

See also 
2010 Dow Corning Tennis Classic - Doubles

External Links
 Singles draw

Dow Corning Tennis Classic
Dow Corning Tennis Classic
2010 in sports in Michigan
2010 in American tennis